IU may refer to:

Businesses and organisations

Sport
Islamabad United, a cricket team franchise in Pakistan Super League

Universities
Indiana University, a multi-campus public university system in the state of Indiana, United States
Islamic University, Bangladesh
Ho Chi Minh City International University, a member institution of Vietnam Vietnam National University in Ho Chi Minh city
Independence University
International University, Cambodia, a private higher education institution in Phnom Penh, Cambodia
Isra University, Hyderabad, Sindh, Pakistan
Istanbul University
Ittihad University, Ras Al Khaimah, United Arab Emirates

Other organizations
The IU, a Georgist political organization in London
Intermediate Unit, a regional educational service agency in Pennsylvania
Izquierda Unida ("United Left" in Spanish, political party)
Izquierda Unida (Argentina)
Izquierda Unida (Spain)

Language
Intonational unit, a segment of speech
Inuktitut language (ISO 639 alpha-2)

Science, technology, and mathematics
Iu interface, in the RANAP telecommunications protocol
Instruction unit, the part of a computer CPU that manages instruction fetch and instruction issue
Saturn V instrument unit, a guidance system for the Saturn V rocket
International unit, a unit for biological activity used in pharmacology
Inter-universal Teichmüller theory, a mathematical theory by Shinichi Mochizuki

Other uses
IU (singer) (born 1993), South Korean singer
I U (EP), a 2011 Japanese compilation album by IU
Super Air Jet, IATA Code IU